Kismet is a city in Seward County, Kansas, United States.  As of the 2020 census, the population of the city was 340.

History
The first post office in Kismet was established in November 1888.

Geography
Kismet is located at  (37.205043, -100.701081).

Demographics

2010 census
As of the census of 2010, there were 459 people, 145 households, and 115 families residing in the city. The racial makeup of the city was 86.1% White, 0.7% African American, 1.5% Native American, 0.4% Asian, 9.4% from other races, and 2.0% from two or more races. Hispanic or Latino of any race were 35.5% of the population.

There were 145 households, of which 48.3% had children under the age of 18 living with them, 67.6% were married couples living together, 9.0% had a female householder with no husband present, 2.8% had a male householder with no wife present, and 20.7% were non-families. 19.3% of all households were made up of individuals, and 9% had someone living alone who was 65 years of age or older. The average household size was 3.17 and the average family size was 3.64.

The median age in the city was 29.1 years. 37.9% of residents were under the age of 18; 7.2% were between the ages of 18 and 24; 26.6% were from 25 to 44; 18.2% were from 45 to 64; and 10.2% were 65 years of age or older. The gender makeup of the city was 52.5% male and 47.5% female.

2000 census
As of the census of 2000, there were 484 people, 159 households, and 123 families residing in the city. The racial makeup of the city was 71.90% White, 1.24% African American, 0.62% Native American, 21.07% from other races, and 5.17% from two or more races. Hispanic or Latino of any race were 32.23% of the population.

There were 159 households, out of which 54.7% had children under the age of 18 living with them, 66.0% were married couples living together, 7.5% had a female householder with no husband present, and 22.6% were non-families. 19.5% of all households were made up of individuals, and 7.5% had someone living alone who was 65 years of age or older. The average household size was 3.04 and the average family size was 3.51.

In the city, the population was spread out, with 37.8% under the age of 18, 7.9% from 18 to 24, 29.5% from 25 to 44, 17.1% from 45 to 64, and 7.6% who were 65 years of age or older. The median age was 28 years. For every 100 females, there were 106.8 males. For every 100 females age 18 and over, there were 102.0 males.

The median income for a household in the city was $39,531, and the median income for a family was $38,750. Males had a median income of $25,729 versus $29,583 for females. The per capita income for the city was $15,600. About 10.5% of families and 11.2% of the population were below the poverty line, including 12.8% of those under age 18 and none of those age 65 or over.

Education
Kismet is a part of USD 483 Southwestern Heights. The district high school, Southwestern Heights, is located between Kismet and Plains. The Southwestern Heights High School mascot is Southwestern Heights Mustangs.

Kismet High School was closed through school unification. The Kismet High School mascot was Kismet Pirates.

References

Further reading

External links
 Kismet - Directory of Public Officials
 USD 483, local school district
 Kismet history
 Kismet City Map, KDOT

Cities in Kansas
Cities in Seward County, Kansas